William Savona (7 January 1865 – 18 January 1937) was a Maltese politician. He was the first leader and the founder of the Maltese Labour Party from 1925 to 1927, served as Minister for post, customs, agriculture and fisheries 1922–23. He resigned his position of Partit Laburista in 1927, and was succeeded by Colonel Michael Dundon MD.

Jointed the RMA serving in France and Salonica during World War I, awarded the MBE.

Family 
Savona was the son of Sigismondo Savona. Savona was married to Nusa Rosenbush, and had at least two sons and four daughters.

Education
Savona was educated at the Lyceum (Malta), and he later studied law at the University of Malta, graduating in 1886.

Political life 
In 1919 he joined the worker's movement becoming vice-president, later president, of the Camera del Lavoro (Labour Party). He was appointed Minister for post, customs, agriculture and fisheries in 1922–23. Savona remained active in politics until 1928.

External links
 Labour Party website www.partitlaburista.org
 Search Malta www.searchmalta.com/surnames/savona/index.shtml

References

1865 births
1937 deaths
Labour Party (Malta) politicians
Leaders of political parties in Malta
Members of the House of Representatives of Malta
People from Valletta
Government ministers of Malta
University of Malta alumni
20th-century Maltese politicians